The 2016 Tour de Suisse was the 80th edition of the Tour de Suisse cycling stage race. It took place from 11 to 19 June as the nineteenth event of the 2016 UCI World Tour. It was won by Colombian cyclist Miguel Ángel López.


Schedule

Participating teams
As the Tour de Suisse is a UCI World Tour event, all eighteen UCI Pro Teams were invited automatically and obliged to enter a team into the race. Four teams were also given wildcard places in the race.

Stages

Stage 1
11 June 2016 – Baar,  Individual time trial (ITT)

Stage 2
12 June 2016 – Baar to Baar,

Stage 3
13 June 2016 – Grosswangen to Rheinfelden,

Stage 4
14 June 2016 – Rheinfelden to Champagne,

Stage 5
15 June 2016 – Brig-Glis to Cari,

Stage 6
16 June 2016 – Weesen to Amden,

Stage 7
17 June 2016 – Arbon to Sölden (Austria),

Stage 8
18 June 2016 – Davos,  Individual time trial

Stage 9
19 June 2016 – La Punt to Davos,

Classification leadership
In the Tour de Suisse, three different jerseys were awarded. For the general classification, calculated by adding each cyclist's finishing times on each stage, and the leader received a yellow jersey. This classification was considered the most important of the Tour de Suisse, and the winner of the classification was considered the winner of the race. There was also a mountains classification, the leadership of which was marked by a light blue jersey. In the mountains classification, points were won by reaching the top of a climb before other cyclists, with more points available for the higher-categorised climbs. Hors Category gave 20 points to the first rider crossing (20, 15, 10, 6, 4), a Category 1 was worth 12 points (12, 8, 6, 4, 2), a Category 2 was worth 8 points (8, 6, 4, 2, 1) and a Category 3 was worth 5 points (5, 3, 2, 1).

The third jersey represented the points classification, marked by a black jersey. In the points classification, cyclists got points for finishing highly in a stage. A stage victory awarded 10 points, with 8 points for second, 6 for third, 4 for fourth and 2 for fifth. Points could also be earned at intermediate sprints location for finishing in the top three during each stage on a 6–3–1 scale. There was also a classification for teams, in which the times of the best three cyclists per team on each stage were added together; the leading team at the end of the race was the team with the lowest total time.

A combativity award was also attributed for the rider who had ridden the most aggressively in the eyes of the judges at the end of every stage. It could have been a rider who featured in breakaways or a cyclist who attacked often.

Notes
 In stage 2, Jürgen Roelandts, who was second in the points classification, wore the black jersey, because Fabian Cancellara (in first place) wore the yellow jersey as leader of the general classification during that stage.  Martin Elmiger, who was second in the Swiss rider classification, wore the red jersey, because Fabian Cancellara (in first place) wore the yellow jersey as leader of the overall classification during that stage.
 In stage 3, Martin Elmiger, who was second in the Swiss rider classification, wore the red jersey, because Fabian Cancellara (in first place) wore the black jersey as leader of the points classification during that stage.
 In stage 4, Fabian Cancellara, who was third in the points classification, wore the black jersey, because Peter Sagan (in first place) wore the yellow jersey as leader of the overall classification and Silvan Dillier (in second place) wore the red jersey as the leader of the Swiss rider classification during that stage.
 In stage 5, Maximiliano Richeze, who was second in the points classification, wore the black jersey, because Peter Sagan (in first place) wore the yellow jersey as leader of the overall classification during that stage.

References

External links

 

Tour de Suisse
Tour de Suisse
2016 in Swiss sport